The  (lit. the department of the great treasury) was a division of the eighth-century Japanese government of the Imperial Court in Kyoto, instituted in the Asuka period and formalized during the Heian period.  The Ministry was replaced in the Meiji period.

Overview
The nature of the ministry was modified in response to changing times. The ambit of the Ministry's activities encompasses, for example:
 administration of public accounts
 oversight of tax collections and of offerings to the Emperor
 regulation of weights and measures
 control of the functuations in prices of commodities
 regulation and oversight of the coinage of gold, silver, copper, and iron money
 maintenance of the lists of artisans engaged in coinage-related activities
 regulation of activities in the manufacture of lacquer ware, weaving, and other kinds of industries

History
The duties, responsibilities and focus of the ministry evolved over time.  It was established as part of the Taika Reforms and Ritsuryō laws.  Since 1885, Ōkura-shō has been construed in reference to the Ministry of Finance, also called the Ōkura no Tsukasa.

Hierarchy
The court included a ministry dealing with military affairs.

Amongst the significant daijō-kan officials serving in this ministry structure were:
 . This official supervises the receipt of tributes from the provinces and imposes tribute on others.
 
 
 , two positions
 , two positions

See also
 Daijō-kan
 Ministry of Finance (Japan)

Notes

References
 Kawakami, Karl Kiyoshi. (1903). The Political Ideas of the Modern Japan.  Iowa City, Iowa: University of Iowa Press. OCLC 466275784.   Internet Archive, full text
 Nussbaum, Louis Frédéric and Käthe Roth. (2005). Japan Encyclopedia. Cambridge: Harvard University Press. ; OCLC 48943301
 Titsingh, Isaac. (1834). Nihon Odai Ichiran; ou,  Annales des empereurs du Japon.  Paris: Royal Asiatic Society, Oriental Translation Fund of Great Britain and Ireland.  OCLC 5850691

Japan
Government of feudal Japan
Meiji Restoration
Treasury